Sir Edward Barkham (died 15 January 1634) was an English merchant who was Lord Mayor of London in 1621.

Barkham was a city of London merchant and a member of the Worshipful Company of Leathersellers. He was Master of the Leathersellers Company from 1608 to 1706, and from 1608 to 1609. On 28 February 1611, he was elected an alderman of the City of London for Farringdon Within ward. He was Sheriff of London from 1611 to 1612. He transferred to the Worshipful Company of Drapers on 10 July 1621 and became alderman for Cheap ward in the same year.

In 1621, he was chosen as Lord Mayor of London, and on 29 October his inauguration was celebrated with a pageant devised by Thomas Middleton. He was knighted on 16 June 1622 and was Master of the Drapers Company from 1622 to 1623. He was the great-great-grandfather of Prime Minister Robert Walpole.'''

Barkham was the father of Sir Edward Barkham, 1st Baronet, of South Acre.

His wife Jane (Crouch) and son Edward were executors of his last will and testament.

References

Year of birth missing
1634 deaths
Sheriffs of the City of London
17th-century lord mayors of London
English merchants